The Derry county hurling team represents Derry GAA, the county board of the Gaelic Athletic Association, in the Gaelic sport of hurling. The team competes in the Christy Ring Cup and the National Hurling League.

Derry's home ground is Celtic Park, Derry. The team's managers are Dominic McKinley and Cormac Donnelly.

The team last won the Ulster Senior Championship in 2001, but has never won the All-Ireland Senior Championship or the National League.

History
Derry was a hotbed of early hurling activity, with the city's St Patrick's club winning the Ulster Senior Hurling Championship in 1902–03; county teams mainly drawn from the city won the 1906 championship by a walkover, and the contested 1909 final. However, soon afterwards football become the dominant sport in the county, and hurling activity declined, especially in the city where association football clubs were active.

It was the 1970s before Derry claimed any more major hurling honours. The county won two Ulster Junior Championships in 1974 and 1975, as well as the 1975 All-Ireland Junior Championship. The county also won the Ulster Minor Championship twice during the decade in 1973/4? and 1979, before going on to win the next four at the start of the 1980s (1980, 1981, 1982 and 1983); giving the county five consecutive Ulster Minor titles. Derry also won another Ulster Junior (1984) and All-Ireland Junior Championship (1982), with Rory Stevenson still holding a record of his own, as the youngest person ever to play in a Final in Croke Park, that year (1982), playing for Kevin Lynch's Hurling Club Under 14 All-Ireland Féile na nGael winning team.

The 1990s started with Derry claiming back-to-back Ulster Minor titles in 1990 and 1991. The Under 21 side won two more Ulster Under 21 Championships in 1993 and 1997. Derry won the All-Ireland 'B' Senior Hurling Championship in 1996 and the Ulster Intermediate Championship the following year.

In 2000 Derry won its first Ulster Senior Hurling Championship in 92 years, and successfully defended it the following year. The county also won the Ulster Minor Championship in 2001. The Seniors won the Nicky Rackard Cup in 2006. Derry Under 21s claimed back-to-back Ulster Under 21 titles in 2007 and 2008. See 2008 Derry county hurling team season for information from then. The seniors won the Nicky Rackard Cup again in 2017.

John McEvoy resigned as Derry hurling manager at the end of 2020, having completed two years at the helm. Former Antrim hurlers Dominic McKinley and Cormac Donnelly replaced McEvoy as head coaches shortly afterwards, with it being McKinley's second spell in charge of the Derry senior hurlers.

Current panel

Recent players include:

 Cormac O'Doherty

Current management team
Head coaches: Dominic McKinley and Cormac Donnelly

Managerial history
Kevin McNaughton 1997–2001

Dominic McKinley (Antrim) 2001–2004

Seán McCloskey 2004–2006

Gabriel O'Kane 2006–2008

Brian McGilligan 2008–2010

James O'Kane 2010–2011

Ger Rogan 2011–2014

Tom McLean 2014–2016

Colm McGurk 2016–2018

John McEvoy (Laois) 2018–2020

Dominic McKinley and Cormac Donnelly (Antrim) 2020–

Honours
Official honours, with additions noted.

National
 All-Ireland Senior Hurling Championship
 Semi-finalists (1): 1902
Quarter-finalists (2): 2000, 2001
Preliminary quarter-finalists (1): 1996
National Hurling League Division 2B
 Winners (1): 2022
All-Ireland Senior B Hurling Championship/Joe McDonagh Cup
 Winners (1): 1996
All-Ireland Intermediate Hurling Championship/Christy Ring Cup
 Runners-up (2): 2015, 2021
 All-Ireland Junior Hurling Championship/Nicky Rackard Cup
 Winners (4): 1975, 1982, 2006, 2017
 Runners-up (2): 1974, 1979

Provincial
Ulster Senior Hurling Championship
 Winners (4): 1902, 1908, 2000, 2001
 Runners-up (9): 1901, 1907, 1931, 1998, 1999, 2003, 2011, 2012, 2014 
Ulster Intermediate Hurling Championship
 Winners (1): 1997
Ulster Junior Hurling Championship
 Winners (3): 1974, 1975, 1984
Ulster Under-21 Hurling Championship
 Winners (7): 1986, 1987, 1993, 1997, 2007, 2008, 2017
Ulster Minor Hurling Championship
 Winners (9): 1974, 1979, 1980, 1981, 1982, 1983, 1990, 1991, 2001

Head-to-head record

Head-to-head Championship record 
Every championship result 2015. Includes results from the Ulster Senior Hurling Championship.

  

As of 27 December 2022.

Counties Derry has never played in the championship since 2015

References

 
County hurling teams